The Men's team sprint competition at the FIS Nordic World Ski Championships 2021 was held on 28 February 2021.

Results

Semifinals

Semifinal A
The semifinal was started at 11:56.

Semifinal B
The semifinal was started at 12:24.

Final
The final was started at 13:30.

References

Men's team sprint